Karakaya may refer to:

Places
Dzoravank, Armenia
Gharaghaya, Armenia
Karakaya Dam, a dam on the Euphrates River in Diyarbakır Province, Turkey
Karakaya, Altıeylül, a village
Karakaya, Araç, a village in Araç District of Kastamonu Province, Turkey
Karakaya, Bayat
Karakaya, Çal
Karakaya, Çermik
Karakaya, Çüngüş
Karakaya, Dursunbey, a village
Karakaya, Gümüşhacıköy, a village in Gümüşhacıköy district of Amasya Province, Turkey
Karakaya, İliç
Karakaya, İspir
Karakaya, İscehisar, a village in İscehisar district of Afyonkarahisar Province, Turkey
Karakaya, Karayazı
Karakaya, Manavgat, a village in Manavgat district of Antalya Province, Turkey
Karakaya, Mengen, a village Mengen district of Bolu Province, Turkey
Karakaya, Polatlı, a village in Polatlı district of Ankara Province, Turkey
Karakaya, Silifke, a village in Silifke district of Mersin Province, Turkey
Karakaya, Söke, a village in Söke district of Aydın Province, Turkey
Karakaya, Sungurlu
Karakaya, Üzümlü
Karakaya (Skalisty Range)
Qaraqaya, Ismailli, Azerbaijan
Qaraqaya, Yardymli, Azerbaijan

Other uses
Karakaya (surname)